Polbeth (G. Poll - pool beithe - birch tree "birch pool")  is a former oil shale mining village located about a mile from West Calder, and not far from Livingston, West Lothian, Scotland.

Five Sisters
A mile to the west of the village are the Five Sisters Shale Bings, a local landmark and scheduled monument.

Five Sisters Zoo Park
The Five Sisters Zoo Park is located on the edge of the village and has animals such as a lion and wolves.

Polbeth Harwood Church 

Harwood Church was one of two Church of Scotland churches in West Calder. The other was in Polbeth, and the two churches were amalgamated.

Worship in Polbeth took place in what previously had been the Engine House of Shale Pit 26. When mining ceased in the community the Engine House was converted into what is now known as Polbeth Hall. Worship took place here while the new church was being built.

Notable people
 Rhys McCabe, footballer currently player-manager of Airdrieonians
 Shelley Kerr, former footballer. Current coach of the women's Scottish national football team.
 Callum Fordyce, footballer currently playing for Airdrieonians
 Billy Hartman, actor

References

External links

 Polbeth Harwood Church

Villages in West Lothian